Scutigera linceci, the Arizona house centipede (originally described as Cermatia linceci) is a species of the Scutigeromorph centipede found in the Southern United States and Central America. Its species name refers to Dr Lincecum, a field naturalist. In the wild, they live under stones and in hollow logs, but the species frequently enters human habitation.

Appearance 
Scutigera linceci is much smaller than the common house centipede, Scutigera coleoptrata, growing to only , and can further by differentiated from the latter species by the shape of the head and tergites, and its colouration.

Notes

References 

Animals described in 1867
Arthropods of North America
Scutigeromorpha